Zabielne  (Sobiellen; from 1938-45 Podersbach) is a village in the administrative district of Gmina Olecko, within Olecko County, Warmian-Masurian Voivodeship, in northern Poland. 

References

Zabielne